Coomber's relationship can be used to describe how the internal pressure and dielectric constant of a non-polar liquid are related.

As , which defines the internal pressure of a liquid, it can be found that:

where
 is equal to the number of molecules
 is the ionization potential of the liquid
 is a temperature dependent relation based on numerical constants of the pair summation from inter-particle geometry
 is the polarizability
 is the volume of the liquid
where for most non-polar liquids

References
 Meeten, G.H., "Theoretical Basis for Coomber's Relationship", Nature Vol. 223, August 23, 1969

Physical chemistry